Pseudobixatoides nonveilleri is a species of beetle in the family Cerambycidae, and the only species in the genus Pseudobixatoides. It was described by Stephan von Breuning in 1975.

References

Lamiini
Beetles described in 1975